Barbara Spinelli (born 31 May 1946) is an Italian politician.

Barbara Spinelli is the daughter of federalist political theorist Altiero Spinelli and Ursula Hirschmann, who was a German-Jewish anti-fascist activist.

From 2014 to 2019, Spinelli served as a Member of the European Parliament, representing Central Italy.

Spinelli was elected to represent The Other Europe, but left the alliance in May 2015, after declaring it a "failed project". She is one of the founders of the newspaper La Repubblica.

Spinelli is a member of the Advisory Panel of DiEM25

Parliamentary service
Vice-chair, Committee on Constitutional Affairs

Personal life

She has three older maternal half-sisters (Silvia, Renata and Eva) from her mother's first marriage to Eugenio Colorni and two sisters (Diana and Sara). Her half-sister Eva Colorni, an economist, was married to a fellow Indian economist Amartya Sen from 1973 to her death in 1985. Another half-sister, Renata Colorni, is a translator.

References

1946 births
Living people
Italian people of Jewish descent
European United Left–Nordic Green Left MEPs
MEPs for Italy 2014–2019
21st-century women MEPs for Italy
The Other Europe MEPs
Politicians from Rome
Italian newspaper editors
Italian women editors
Women newspaper editors
La Repubblica founders